The Shipton-on-Cherwell train crash was a major disaster which occurred on the Great Western Railway. It involved the derailment of a long passenger train at Shipton-on-Cherwell near Kidlington, Oxfordshire, England, on Christmas Eve, 24 December 1874, and was one of the worst  ever disasters on the Great Western Railway.

Colonel William Yolland of the Railway Inspectorate led the investigation and chaired the subsequent Court of Enquiry of the Board of Trade. Its report highlighted several safety problems including wheel design, braking and communications along trains. The accident came in a decade which saw many terrible accidents on the rail network, and which culminated in the Tay Rail Bridge disaster of 1879.

Accident
The accident happened a few hundred yards from the village of Hampton Gay and close to Shipton-on-Cherwell. The train with 13 carriages and two engines had left Oxford station for Birmingham Snow Hill at 11:40. The train was approximately 30 minutes behind schedule and travelling about  when after  the tyre of the wheel on a third-class carriage broke. The carriage left the track for about  including the bridge of the River Cherwell. After the bridge and before a similar bridge across the Oxford Canal the carriage went down an embankment taking other carriages with it, breaking up as they crossed the field. Three carriages and a goods carried on over the canal bridge, and another fell into the water. The front section of the train carried on for some distance. The owner and men from the Hampton Gay paper mill close to the accident site tried to assist the injured in the snow. Telegrams were sent to local stations to summon medical help but it took an hour and a half before a doctor appeared. A special train was used to move the injured back to hospitals in Oxford. At least 26 died at the scene while four others were dead by the time the special train had arrived at Oxford station. At least one other died in hospital. The canal was dragged, but no bodies were found.

Causes

The basic cause was found to be a broken tyre on the carriage just behind the locomotive, but that failure was worsened by the poor braking system fitted to the train. When a passenger warned the fireman of the problem, by waving from the carriage window, it was still being pulled along intact along the rails. However, the driver braked immediately, before the brake at the rear of the train in the guard's van could be applied. The engine brake caused the failed carriage to be crushed, and the carriages behind derailed near the Oxford Canal. There were 34 deaths and 69 seriously injured in the carriages which fell from the bridge over the canal.

Inquiry
The inquiry that followed quickly established the root causes. The tyre was on an old carriage and was of an obsolete design. The fracture started at a rivet hole, possibly by metal fatigue, although it was not recognised as such by the Inquiry. The weather was very cold that day, with snow blanketing the fields and very low freezing temperatures, another factor that hastened the tyre failure. The Railway Inspectorate recommended that the railway companies adopt Mansell wheels, a type of wooden composite wheel, as the design had a better safety record than the alternatives. There had been a long history of failed wheels involved in serious accidents, especially in the previous decade. The problem of broken wheels was not resolved until cast steel monobloc wheels were introduced.

The disaster led to a reappraisal of braking methods and systems, and the eventual fitting of continuous automatic brakes to trains, using either the Westinghouse air brake or a vacuum brake. 

The Inspectorate was also critical of the communication method between the locomotive and the rest of the train using an external cord and gong, suggesting that a telegraphic method should be adopted instead.

Inquest
An inquest was opened on 26 December 1874 using the manor house at Hampton Gay; the 26 bodies found at the scene were laid out in two rows in a large paper store in the paper mill for the court to view and seek formal identification and the wreckage was also examined. The coroner and jury decided to re-convene in Oxford and permission was given to move the wreckage but only one carriage would be moved to Oxford for further investigation and examination.

The following week the coroner returned to Hampton Gay to further identify bodies and also those which had been kept in the third class waiting room at the Oxford Railway Station and one at Radcliffe Infirmary.

Related incident 

Showell's Dictionary of Birmingham, discussing the accident, notes that:

See also
Cherwell Valley Line
List of rail accidents in the United Kingdom
Lytham rail crash

References

Sources and further reading

External links

Derailments in England
Railway accidents in 1874
1874 in England
Rail transport in Oxfordshire
Disasters in Oxfordshire
Accidents and incidents involving Great Western Railway
19th century in Oxfordshire
December 1874 events
1874 disasters in the United Kingdom